Shagufta Jumani (Sindhi: شگفته جماڻي) is a Pakistani politician who has been a member of the National Assembly of Pakistan, since August 2018. Previously she was member of the National Assembly from 2002 to May 2018.

Political career

She was elected to the National Assembly of Pakistan as a candidate of Pakistan Peoples Party (PPP) on a seat reserved for women from Sindh in the 2002 Pakistani general election.

She was re-elected to the National Assembly as a candidate of PPP on a seat reserved for women from Sindh in the 2008 Pakistani general election.

She was re-elected to the National Assembly as a candidate of PPP on a reserved seat for women from Sindh in 2013 Pakistani general election.

She was re-elected to the National Assembly as a candidate of PPP on a seat reserved for women from Sindh in the 2018 Pakistani general election.

References

Living people
Pakistan People's Party MNAs
Sindhi people
Pakistani MNAs 2013–2018
People from Sindh
Pakistani MNAs 2008–2013
Pakistani MNAs 2002–2007
Women members of the National Assembly of Pakistan
Year of birth missing (living people)
Pakistani MNAs 2018–2023
21st-century Pakistani women politicians